Uptown Saturday Night is the debut studio album from American hip hop group Camp Lo, released January 28, 1997 on Profile Records and distributed through Arista Records. The album was largely produced by Ski and spawned the hit single, "Luchini AKA This Is It".

The album peaked at twenty-seven on the U.S. Billboard 200 and reached the fifth spot on the R&B Albums chart.

Release and reception

Uptown Saturday Night is often hailed as a classic by fans and critics. Leo Stanley of AllMusic called the album "a refreshing fusion of hip-hop, soul, and jazz that manages to avoid most jazz-rap clichés while retaining street credibility", and "a worthwhile debut".

Cover art
The album cover is a homage to the album cover of Marvin Gaye's I Want You, which featured the painting "Sugar Shack" by Ernie Barnes.

Track listing
All tracks produced by Ski, except track 4 produced by Trugoy the Dove, track 14 co-produced by Ill Will Fulton, and track 15 co-produced by Jocko.

Charts

Weekly charts

Year-end charts

Singles

Personnel
art direction – Carla Leighton
artwork – Dr. Revolt
assistant engineering – Dejuana Perignon, Dexter Thibou, Max Vargas
bass – Joe Quinde
design – Carla Leighton
engineering – Guido, Joe Quinde
executive production – Ill Will Fulton
illustrations – Dr. Revolt
mastering – Alan Douches
mixing – Guido, Kenny Ortíz, Joe Quinde
multi-instruments – Joe Mendelson
performer(s) – The Bones
photography – Christian Lantry
piano – Pete Levin
production – Joe "Ski" Chink, Ill Will Fulton, Jocko, Trugoy the Dove
vibraphone – Bill Ware
vocals – Tracey Amos
vocals (background) – Bill Ware
Source: Allmusic

Notes

External links
 
 Uptown Saturday Night at Discogs

1997 debut albums
Albums produced by Ski Beatz
Arista Records albums
Camp Lo albums
Profile Records albums